Showtime is an Australian television series which aired on ABC from 1959 to 1960. It was a short-lived variety series which featured pianist Ted Preston and other performers. It aired live in Melbourne. It is shown in a 1959 television schedule as airing at 9:00PM, aired against Whitehall Playhouse on HSV-7 (consisting of selections from various American anthology series) and U.S. series The Loretta Young Show on GTV-9 (also an anthology series). It is not known if any of the episodes survive as kinescopes.

References

External links
 

1959 Australian television series debuts
1960 Australian television series endings
Australian variety television shows
Australian Broadcasting Corporation original programming
Black-and-white Australian television shows
English-language television shows